GMW may refer to:
 Global Money Week
 GMW Architects, a defunct British architectural practice
 Guangming Online, a Chinese news website
 Heckler & Koch GMW, a German grenade launcher
 West Germanic languages